The Department of Resources, Energy and Tourism was an Australian Government department. It was formed in December 2007 and dissolved on 18 September 2013. The majority of its functions were assumed by the Department of Industry; with the exception of tourism functions that were assumed by the Department of Foreign Affairs and Trade.

Operational activities
The functions of the department were broadly classified into the following matters:
Energy policy
Mineral and energy industries, including oil and gas, and electricity
National energy market
Energy-specific international organisations and activities
Administration of export controls on rough diamonds, uranium and thorium
Minerals and energy resources research, science and technology
Tourism industry
Geoscience research and information services including geodesy, mapping, remote sensing and land information co-ordination
Radioactive waste management
Renewable energy technology development
Clean fossil fuel energy
Industrial energy efficiency
energy sources
-fossil fuels

Structure
The Department was an Australian Public Service department, staffed by officials who were responsible to the Minister for Resources, Energy and Tourism.

Secretary
The Department was headed by a Secretary, initially Peter Boxall. When Boxall announced his retirement in 2008, John Pierce was appointed in his place. Pierce was succeeded by Drew Clarke in April 2010. Clarke shifted to the Department of Broadband, Communications and the Digital Economy in February 2013.

References

Resources, Energy and Tourism
Ministries established in 2007
2007 establishments in Australia
2013 disestablishments in Australia
Organisations based in Canberra